Nordseter Church is a chapel of the Church of Norway in Lillehammer Municipality in Innlandet county, Norway. It is located in the village of Nordseter. It is an annex chapel for the Nordre Ål parish which is part of the Sør-Gudbrandsdal prosti (deanery) in the Diocese of Hamar. The brown, wooden church was built in a long church design in 1964 using plans drawn up by the architect Erling Viksjø. The church seats about 160 people.

History
The push for building a mountain church at Nordseter is said to date back to 1937, but it took almost three decades of meetings, planning and fundraising before the project was realized. In 1949, an architectural competition was held and won by Erling Viksjø. Viksjø later made a model that was shown in different contexts, so that people could form a picture of how it would all be. Land had been purchased a couple of years earlier. However, it seems that the church cause was dormant until the beginning of the 1960s. The church was built in 1963-1964 and it was consecrated on 15 March 1964 by Bishop Kristian Vilhelm Koren Schjelderup Jr. It is an annex chapel under the Nordre Ål Church. In 2009, the church got a new roof. In 2014, a  addition was added on the south side of the building.

See also
List of churches in Hamar

References

Buildings and structures in Lillehammer
Churches in Innlandet
Long churches in Norway
Wooden churches in Norway
20th-century Church of Norway church buildings
Churches completed in 1964
1964 establishments in Norway